Gugah may refer to:
 Gugah, Rahimabad
 Gugah, Siyarastaq Yeylaq, Rahimabad District